John Cochran Park (1804–1889) was an American attorney and politician who served as district attorney of Suffolk County, Massachusetts and a judge of the Newton district court.

Early life
Park was born on June 10, 1804 to Dr. John and Louisa (Adams) Park. He attended Boston public schools and graduated from Harvard College in 1824 and Harvard Law School in 1826. In November 1829 he married Mary F. Moore of Boston. She died in 1852. On November 1, 1854 he married Charlotte Cutter Dean.

Legal and political career
Park was admitted the bar in 1827. In 1832 he defended Charlotte Williams, an African American teenager accused of poisoning five children in the home where she worked as a domestic. She was found not guilty. Park also represented Suffolk County in the Massachusetts General Court for over a decade and was a member of the Boston Common Council in 1835.

On February 4, 1852, Park was appointed Suffolk County district attorney by Governor George S. Boutwell. The following year, Park was removed by Boutwell's successor John H. Clifford.

In 1874, Park was appointed clerk of the Suffolk superior court following the death of Henry Homer. He lost the Republican nomination to William W. Doherty and was succeeded by Homer's assistant, John P. Manning.

In 1864, Park moved to Newton, Massachusetts. He was appointed to a judgeship on the Newton district court by Governor John Davis Long.

Other work
In 1829, Park joined the Ancient and Honorable Artillery Company. He was made an adjutant in 1837, first lieutenant in 1845, and captain in 1853. Around 1740 he was named captain of the Boston City Guard. He also served as captain in the Boston Light Infantry.

Park served for a time as a president of the Charitable Irish Society of Boston.

Later life
In June 1888, Park suffered partial paralysis and was unable to attend to his judicial duties. He was able to recover enough to return to the bench that winter.

In the 1888 United States presidential election, Park broke with the Republican party in favor of Democratic incumbent Grover Cleveland.

Park died on April 21, 1889 in Newton. He was survived by his wife and two sons. His funeral was held on April 26 at the Channing Church in Newton. He was buried in Forest Hills Cemetery.

References

1804 births
1889 deaths
District attorneys in Suffolk County, Massachusetts
Harvard College alumni
Harvard Law School alumni
Lawyers from Boston
Massachusetts state court judges
Members of the Massachusetts House of Representatives
Massachusetts Free Soilers
Massachusetts Republicans
Massachusetts Whigs
People from Newton, Massachusetts
19th-century American judges
19th-century American lawyers